Flight Risk is a seventh album by American rapper The Jacka, released on January 11, 2011. It peaked at No. 70 on the Top R&B/Hip-Hop Albums chart.

Flight Risk includes guest appearances from Yukmouth, Styles P, Turf Talk & C-Bo, amongst other artists.

"Streetlife" contains samples of "Before The Night Is Over" by Joe Simon

Track listing

References

2011 albums
The Jacka albums